HNLMS Jan van Amstel was a  of the Royal Netherlands Navy that served in World War II.

Service history
Jan van Amstel was damaged by an air attack at Surabaya on 6 March 1942, which killed 23 of her crew.

After the capitulation of all forces on Java Jan van Amstel attempted to escape to Australia, but was intercepted and engaged by the Japanese destroyer Arashio on 8 March 1942 in the Madura Strait. She was sunk with heavy loss of life and her surviving crew taken prisoner.

References

Jan van Amstel-class minesweepers
Ships built in Rotterdam
1936 ships
World War II minesweepers of the Netherlands
World War II shipwrecks in the Pacific Ocean
Maritime incidents in March 1942